Antonieto Dumagan Cabajog (born May 10, 1956), often known as Bishop Yiet  or Monsignor Yiet,  is a Filipino Roman Catholic bishop from Bohol, Philippines,  bishop of the Diocese of Surigao.

He was ordained to the priesthood on April 9, 1981, at the Church of the Holy Trinity, Loay, Bohol.  His episcopal ordination was on March 16, 1999, at the age of 43 at the Cathedral of St. Joseph the Worker in Tagbilaran City, Bohol, Philippines.

Biography

Early life

Monsignor Antonieto Cabajog was born on May 10, 1956, in Cebu City,  Province of Cebu, Philippines to Fortunato "Tantoy" Cabajog of Botoc, Loay, Bohol and Agripina "Fannie" Dumagan of neighboring Santa Felomina, Alburquerque, Bohol.  He has one sister,  Madelon Cabajog Blanes, now married to Cres Blanes, and is a doctor of medicine by profession. Both children grew up in Botoc, Loay, Bohol.

Education

Secondary education
 1969-1973: Immaculate Heart of Mary Seminary in Taloto District, Tagbilaran City

Higher education
 1973-1977: Philosophy - Faculty of Philosophy, University of Santo Tomas in España, Sampaloc, Manila
 1977-1980: Theology - Faculty of Theology, University of Santo Tomas
 1980-1981: Canon Law - Faculty of Canon Law, University of Santo Tomas
 1983-1986: Canon Law - Faculty of Canon Law, Pontifical University of St. Thomas Aquinas (Angelicum) in Rome, Italy

Degrees
 Bachelor of Arts (A.B.) from Faculty of Philosophy, University of Santo Tomas (Manila)
 Bachelor of Philosophy (Ph.B.), Faculty of Philosophy,  University of Santo Tomas (Manila)
 Licentiate of Philosophy (Ph.L.), Faculty of Philosophy,  University of Santo Tomas (Manila)
 Bachelor of Theology (S.T.B), Faculty of Theology,  University of Santo Tomas (Manila)
 Licentiate of Canon Law (J.C.L.), Faculty of Canon Law, University of Santo Tomas (Manila)
 Doctor of Canon Law (J.C.D.), Pontifical University of St. Thomas Aquinas (Angelicum), Rome, Italy

Ministry

 1981-1983   Spiritual Director, Immaculate Heart of Mary Seminary (College Dept.), Tagbilaran City
 Professor, Immaculate Heart of Mary Seminary, (College/High School), Tagbilaran City
 1986-1990   Secretary to the Bishop
 Chaplain, Mother Butler Mission Guild
 1987-1988   Diocesan Economus
 1987-1990   Member, Diocesan Economic Council
 1988-1990   Diocesan Chancellor
 Member, Board of Consultors
 Chaplain, Cursillo de Cristianidad
 1989-1990   Associate Judicial Vicar, Diocesan Tribunal
 1990-1993   CBCP Assistant Treasurer
 1990-1994   CBCP Assistant Secretary General
 Defender of the Bond, National Appellate Matrimonial Tribunal
 1991-1994   Professor, UST Faculty of Canon Law
 1992-1994   Member, CBCP Budget & Finance Office
 1993        Judge, National Appellate Matrimonial Tribunal
 Member, Nat'l. Permanent Committee for Int'l. Eucharistic Congresses
 Member, Canon Law Society of the Philippines
 1993-1994   CBCP Acting Treasurer
 1994        Judicial Vicar, Diocesan Tribunal
 Diocesan Economus
 Chaplain, Mother Butler Mission Guild
 1994-1996   Corporate Secretary, Bohol Heritage Foundation
 Member, Diocesan Personnel Board
 Spiritual Director, Immaculate Heart of Mary Seminary (College Dept.)
 Diocesan Chancellor
 Chaplain, Cursillo de Cristianidad
 1996-1997   Parish Priest, St. Augustine Parish, Panglao, Bohol
 1997-1999   Parish Priest, Cathedral of St. Joseph the Worker, Tagbilaran City
 January 13, 1999, Appointed Auxiliary Bishop of Cebu
 July 24, 2001, Appointed Bishop of Surigao

See also

 Paring Bol-anon
 Immaculate Heart of Mary Seminary
 Diocese of Tagbilaran
 List of notable alumni of the Immaculate Heart of Mary Seminary

References

 Most Reverend Antonieto Cabajog, D.D
 Bishop Antonieto Dumagan Cabajog, D.D., Bishop of Surigao

Further reading
 History of the N. Mindanao Dioceses
 Diocese of Surigao
 Diocese of Surigao, Philippines

External links
 Official Website of the Mother Butler Guild
 Official Website of the Diocese of Surigao
 Diocese of Surigao

1956 births
Living people
People from Cebu City
People from Bohol
 Cabajog, Antonieto
University of Santo Tomas alumni
21st-century Roman Catholic bishops in the Philippines